Tokyo Groove is the fourth album by the female Japanese hip-hop unit Halcali. The album is their first in over three years.

The album is a two-disc set. The first disc is compiled with new and original material, the second disc contains cover and collaboration songs. The lead song of the second disc "My Sweet Darlin'" features the original artist, Hitomi Yaida, herself on the track as well.

Artists and producers that Halcali worked with on the album include Verbal (m-flo), Scha Dara Parr, Nona Reeves, Bikke, Suneohair, Ram Rider, and Aigon. Artists that Halcali collaborated with or covered on the second disc include Judy and Mary, Chara, Tokyo No.1 Soul Set, Tamio Okuda, and The Magokoro Brothers.

Tokyo Groove reached number 13 on the Oricon charts, and made its weekly ranking debut at number 20.

Track listing

Disc 1: Original Songs
　"Long Kiss Good Bye" (Produced by Masataka Kitaura) (TV Tokyo anime Naruto Shippuden ending theme)
　 
(Produced by Shigekazu Aida)
　 
(Produced by Suneohair)
　"Yes" 
(Produced by Verbal (M-flo))
　"Tears of Love" 
(Produced by Bikke)
　"Zig Zag Saturday Night" 
(Produced by Nishidera Gouta) (Tokyo MX drama Musical 3 main theme)
　"Endless Night" 
(Produced by Ram Rider) (featuring Bose from Schadaraparr)
　"Halcali Tokyo Groove Two Turntable Mix" 
() (Mixed by Piston Nishigawa)

Disc 2: Cover Songs
　 
(Hitomi Yaida Special cover) (Produced by Ram Rider)
　 
(Schadaraparr cover) (Produced by Tokyo No.1 Soul Set) (Nissan Cube commercial song)
　 
(Heavily sampled from Chara)  (Produced by pal@pop) (Japanese Broadcast Radio Charity Musician image theme song)
　 
(Tamio Okuda cover) (Produced by Kohei Japan from Mellow Yellow)
　　
(Magokoro Brothers cover) (Produced by Kohei Japan from Mellow Yellow)
　 
(Fujio Akatsuka cover) (Produced by Nona Reeves & Hiroyasu Yano)
　 
(Judy and Mary cover) (Produced by Kohei Japan from Mellow Yellow)
　"You May Dream -Halcali ver.-" 
(Sheena & The Rokkets) (Produced by Tokyo No.1 Soul Set)

Tie-Ups
 Long Kiss Good Bye: Ending theme song to the TV anime, "Naruto Shippuden", from October to December 2008. Also used on the show, "Televitamins", throughout December 2008.
 ZIG ZAG SATURDAY NIGHT: Main theme for the Tokyo Mx Drama, "MUSICAL3".
 今夜はブギーバック (Konya wa Boogie Back): Commercial song for Nissan Motors' "Cube".
 Re:やさしい気持ち (Re:Yasashii Kimochi): Theme song for Nippon Broadcast's special, "Radio Charity Musicians". Also used on the show, "Televitamins", throughout February 2009.

References

2010 albums
Halcali albums